Antisemitism in the French Third Republic was notably witnessed in the 20th century in the European regimes at the time. Léon Blum of the Popular Front, a former Prime Minister, suffered the most notable antisemitic attack in France on 13 February 1936.
Shortly before becoming Prime Minister, Blum was dragged from a car and almost beaten to death by the Camelots du Roi, a group of antisemites and royalists. The group's parent organisation, the right-wing Action Française, was dissolved by the government following this incident, not long before the elections that brought Blum to power. Blum became the first socialist and the first Jew to serve as Prime Minister of France.  As such he was an object of particular hatred from antisemitic elements.

References

Antisemitism in France
French Third Republic